Lalewala is a village in the Punjab province of Pakistan. It is located at 30°41'0N 73°48'0E with an altitude of 171 metres (564 feet).

References

Villages in Punjab, Pakistan